"A Test Before Trying" is the tenth episode of the twenty-fourth season of the American animated television series The Simpsons, and the 518th episode overall. It first aired on the Fox network in the United States on January 13, 2013.

The episode is dedicated to the memory of Huell Howser, who appeared in the episode "O Brother, Where Bart Thou?". This episode won the Writers Guild of America Award for Outstanding Writing in Animation at the 66th Writers Guild of America Awards.

Plot
A trio of proctors visit Springfield Elementary School, telling them that they must pass an upcoming standardised test or the school will shut down for having low scores. All of the students take the exam except for Bart, who spent all day playing with a beetle. They eventually fail, which causes the school to be shut down and the children to be sent to different schools. However, when Lisa learns that Bart did not take the exam, she urges him to take it, but he does not care. The following night, however, he changes his mind when he has a nightmare in which Springfield becomes the stupidest town in the country. Bart's test day arrives, but he is still not ready. As a result, he answers the first few questions with the same answer and does not fill in the last answer. However, the lead proctor mistakes the same beetle from earlier, who landed on one of the answer bubbles, for one of Bart's answers (In a conversation with Marge at the end of the episode, the lead proctor hints she has done so on purpose); she announces that he passed the test and the school reopens, despite a wrecking ball knocking into Skinner's office since Superintendent Chalmers assumed Bart would fail.

Meanwhile, Mr. Burns raises the price of electricity. As a result, Homer throws his domestic appliances in the dump, where he finds a parking meter that still functions. He decides to set it up at parking spaces around Springfield, moving to another as soon as someone pays. The scheme goes off without a hitch, until he finds out that Chief Wiggum is onto him. When Wiggum confronts him, he manages to escape in his car, but he accidentally crashes it and the parking meter flies out of the car and lands hard on the street, expiring soon after. When Marge discovers that he still has the money, she has Homer return the money to the community by throwing it down a wishing well.

Reception

Ratings
This episode received a 2.4 rating in the 18-49 demographic and was watched by a total of 5.04 million viewers, making it the 2nd most watched show of that night.

Critical reception
Robert David Sullivan of The A.V. Club gave the episode a B, saying, "If you're liberal, you can see the episode as a criticism of the 'test, test, test' strategy that is often offered as an alternative to better funding of public schools. If you're a conservative, you can laugh at the incompetence and jadedness of the public school administrators. Bart, no doubt, doesn't care what you do."

Joel H. Cohen won the Writers Guild of America Award for Outstanding Writing in Animation at the 66th Writers Guild of America Awards for his script to this episode.

References

External links 
 
 "A Test Before Trying" at theSimpsons.com

The Simpsons (season 24) episodes
2013 American television episodes